Solutré-Pouilly is a commune in the Saône-et-Loire department in the region of Bourgogne-Franche-Comté in eastern France. It is known for a local geological feature, the Rock of Solutré.

Wine
The vineyards of Solutré-Pouilly are part of the appellation d'origine contrôlée Pouilly-Fuissé.  Local wineries include the Domaine du Chalet Pouilly.

Points of interest
Parc archéologique et botanique de Solutré

See also
Solutrean, the Paleolithic style named after a site near the village.
Communes of the Saône-et-Loire department
Rock of Solutré

References

Communes of Saône-et-Loire